This is a partial list of unnumbered minor planets for principal provisional designations assigned during 1–31 January 2002. , a total of 286 bodies remain unnumbered for this period. Objects for this year are listed on the following pages: A–B · C · D–F · G–K · L–O · P · Qi · Qii · Ri · Rii · S · Ti · Tii · U–V and W–Y. Also see previous and next year.

A 

|- id="2002 AV" bgcolor=#FFC2E0
| 1 || 2002 AV || APO || 20.9 || data-sort-value="0.23" | 230 m || multiple || 2002–2005 || 11 Jul 2005 || 211 || align=left | Disc.: LINEARPotentially hazardous object || 
|- id="2002 AY1" bgcolor=#FFC2E0
| 0 ||  || ATE || 20.94 || data-sort-value="0.23" | 230 m || multiple || 2002–2014 || 20 Dec 2014 || 115 || align=left | Disc.: LINEARPotentially hazardous object || 
|- id="2002 AZ1" bgcolor=#FFC2E0
| – ||  || APO || 21.4 || data-sort-value="0.19" | 190 m || single || 35 days || 11 Feb 2002 || 69 || align=left | Disc.: SpacewatchPotentially hazardous object || 
|- id="2002 AA2" bgcolor=#FFC2E0
| 0 ||  || AMO || 20.5 || data-sort-value="0.28" | 280 m || multiple || 2002–2019 || 12 Mar 2019 || 109 || align=left | Disc.: AMOS || 
|- id="2002 AB2" bgcolor=#FFC2E0
| 2 ||  || ATE || 23.31 || data-sort-value="0.077" | 77 m || multiple || 2002–2021 || 07 Dec 2021 || 50 || align=left | Disc.: LINEAR || 
|- id="2002 AQ2" bgcolor=#FFC2E0
| 0 ||  || AMO || 18.6 || data-sort-value="0.68" | 680 m || multiple || 2001–2015 || 10 Apr 2015 || 164 || align=left | Disc.: LINEAR || 
|- id="2002 AG3" bgcolor=#fefefe
| 0 ||  || HUN || 18.58 || data-sort-value="0.57" | 570 m || multiple || 2002–2019 || 14 Nov 2019 || 80 || align=left | Disc.: Whipple Obs.Alt.: 2005 GX38 || 
|- id="2002 AY3" bgcolor=#FFC2E0
| 1 ||  || AMO || 20.7 || data-sort-value="0.26" | 260 m || multiple || 2002–2016 || 03 Sep 2016 || 92 || align=left | Disc.: LINEAR || 
|- id="2002 AR4" bgcolor=#FFC2E0
| 3 ||  || AMO || 20.0 || data-sort-value="0.36" | 360 m || single || 171 days || 06 Jun 2002 || 32 || align=left | Disc.: LINEAR || 
|- id="2002 AS4" bgcolor=#FFC2E0
| – ||  || APO || 22.0 || data-sort-value="0.14" | 140 m || single || 5 days || 13 Jan 2002 || 19 || align=left | Disc.: LINEARPotentially hazardous object || 
|- id="2002 AT4" bgcolor=#FFC2E0
| 0 ||  || AMO || 21.2 || data-sort-value="0.20" | 200 m || multiple || 2001–2006 || 27 Nov 2006 || 195 || align=left | Disc.: LINEARPotentially hazardous object || 
|- id="2002 AS5" bgcolor=#FA8072
| 4 ||  || MCA || 19.3 || data-sort-value="0.41" | 410 m || single || 88 days || 11 Mar 2002 || 51 || align=left | Disc.: NEAT || 
|- id="2002 AW5" bgcolor=#FA8072
| 0 ||  || MCA || 19.44 || data-sort-value="0.38" | 380 m || multiple || 2001–2022 || 08 Jan 2022 || 72 || align=left | Disc.: LINEAR || 
|- id="2002 AN8" bgcolor=#fefefe
| 0 ||  || MBA-I || 17.9 || data-sort-value="0.78" | 780 m || multiple || 2002–2020 || 16 Nov 2020 || 76 || align=left | Disc.: Spacewatch || 
|- id="2002 AC9" bgcolor=#FFC2E0
| 0 ||  || APO || 21.13 || data-sort-value="0.21" | 210 m || multiple || 2002–2022 || 27 Jan 2022 || 89 || align=left | Disc.: LINEARPotentially hazardous object || 
|- id="2002 AO11" bgcolor=#FFC2E0
| 4 ||  || ATE || 22.7 || data-sort-value="0.175" | 175 m || multiple || 2002–2016 || 10 Jan 2016 || 18 || align=left | Disc.: LINEAR || 
|- id="2002 AK14" bgcolor=#FFC2E0
| 3 ||  || APO || 21.5 || data-sort-value="0.18" | 180 m || multiple || 2000–2002 || 28 Dec 2002 || 49 || align=left | Disc.: LINEAR || 
|- id="2002 AN14" bgcolor=#E9E9E9
| 0 ||  || MBA-M || 18.07 || data-sort-value="0.72" | 720 m || multiple || 2002–2021 || 31 Oct 2021 || 74 || align=left | Disc.: Piszkéstető Stn. || 
|- id="2002 AO14" bgcolor=#FA8072
| 0 ||  || MCA || 18.37 || data-sort-value="0.63" | 630 m || multiple || 2002–2021 || 10 May 2021 || 219 || align=left | Disc.: Črni Vrh Obs.Alt.: 2020 XK8 || 
|- id="2002 AR14" bgcolor=#d6d6d6
| 0 ||  || MBA-O || 16.71 || 2.5 km || multiple || 1999–2021 || 06 Oct 2021 || 108 || align=left | Disc.: Cerro Tololo || 
|- id="2002 AS14" bgcolor=#E9E9E9
| 0 ||  || MBA-M || 16.90 || 2.3 km || multiple || 2002–2021 || 17 Jun 2021 || 124 || align=left | Disc.: Cerro TololoAlt.: 2006 AF12 || 
|- id="2002 AV14" bgcolor=#E9E9E9
| E ||  || MBA-M || 19.0 || data-sort-value="0.67" | 670 m || single || 3 days || 14 Jan 2002 || 17 || align=left | Disc.: Cerro Tololo || 
|- id="2002 AN16" bgcolor=#E9E9E9
| 0 ||  || MBA-M || 17.3 || 1.9 km || multiple || 2002–2019 || 17 Dec 2019 || 53 || align=left | Disc.: SpacewatchAlt.: 2011 AC73 || 
|- id="2002 AK17" bgcolor=#fefefe
| 0 ||  || HUN || 18.16 || data-sort-value="0.69" | 690 m || multiple || 2002–2021 || 19 Jan 2021 || 324 || align=left | Disc.: LINEAR || 
|- id="2002 AQ17" bgcolor=#fefefe
| 0 ||  || HUN || 17.8 || data-sort-value="0.82" | 820 m || multiple || 2002–2019 || 02 Dec 2019 || 169 || align=left | Disc.: LINEAR || 
|- id="2002 AP18" bgcolor=#fefefe
| 0 ||  || HUN || 18.99 || data-sort-value="0.47" | 470 m || multiple || 2002–2022 || 09 Jan 2022 || 47 || align=left | Disc.: LPL/Spacewatch IIAdded on 24 December 2021 || 
|- id="2002 AT18" bgcolor=#fefefe
| 0 ||  || HUN || 18.49 || data-sort-value="0.60" | 600 m || multiple || 2001–2021 || 01 Nov 2021 || 164 || align=left | Disc.: NEAT || 
|- id="2002 AX19" bgcolor=#fefefe
| 0 ||  || HUN || 17.4 || data-sort-value="0.98" | 980 m || multiple || 2002–2021 || 15 Jan 2021 || 283 || align=left | Disc.: LINEARAlt.: 2013 AF2 || 
|- id="2002 AO21" bgcolor=#FA8072
| 0 ||  || MCA || 17.93 || data-sort-value="0.77" | 770 m || multiple || 2001–2021 || 29 Sep 2021 || 74 || align=left | Disc.: LINEAR || 
|- id="2002 AF26" bgcolor=#E9E9E9
| 0 ||  || MBA-M || 17.2 || 2.0 km || multiple || 2000–2019 || 29 Nov 2019 || 81 || align=left | Disc.: LPL/Spacewatch II || 
|- id="2002 AA29" bgcolor=#FFC2E0
| 2 ||  || ATE || 24.1 || data-sort-value="0.054" | 54 m || multiple || 2002–2004 || 15 Jan 2004 || 63 || align=left | Disc.: LINEAR || 
|- id="2002 AD29" bgcolor=#FFC2E0
| 8 ||  || APO || 21.0 || data-sort-value="0.22" | 220 m || single || 11 days || 19 Jan 2002 || 25 || align=left | Disc.: LINEAR || 
|- id="2002 AE29" bgcolor=#FFC2E0
| 7 ||  || APO || 24.6 || data-sort-value="0.043" | 43 m || single || 5 days || 18 Jan 2002 || 20 || align=left | Disc.: LINEAR || 
|- id="2002 AF29" bgcolor=#FFC2E0
| 1 ||  || AMO || 19.2 || data-sort-value="0.51" | 510 m || multiple || 2001–2008 || 27 May 2008 || 126 || align=left | Disc.: AMOS || 
|- id="2002 AH29" bgcolor=#FFC2E0
| 2 ||  || AMO || 21.5 || data-sort-value="0.18" | 180 m || single || 111 days || 05 May 2002 || 126 || align=left | Disc.: LINEAR || 
|- id="2002 AP30" bgcolor=#fefefe
| 2 ||  || MBA-I || 17.9 || data-sort-value="0.78" | 780 m || multiple || 2002–2020 || 19 Oct 2020 || 42 || align=left | Disc.: LINEARAlt.: 2014 YF38 || 
|- id="2002 AL31" bgcolor=#FFC2E0
| 7 ||  || APO || 24.5 || data-sort-value="0.045" | 45 m || single || 8 days || 22 Jan 2002 || 58 || align=left | Disc.: NEAT || 
|- id="2002 AN31" bgcolor=#FA8072
| 2 ||  || MCA || 18.1 || data-sort-value="0.71" | 710 m || multiple || 2002–2019 || 05 Jul 2019 || 51 || align=left | Disc.: LINEAR || 
|- id="2002 AS31" bgcolor=#fefefe
| 4 ||  || HUN || 18.6 || data-sort-value="0.57" | 570 m || multiple || 2002–2021 || 10 Feb 2021 || 29 || align=left | Disc.: LINEARAdded on 9 March 2021Alt.: 2020 XQ9 || 
|- id="2002 AT31" bgcolor=#FA8072
| 1 ||  || MCA || 20.6 || data-sort-value="0.23" | 230 m || multiple || 2001–2019 || 06 Apr 2019 || 50 || align=left | Disc.: LINEAR || 
|- id="2002 AW31" bgcolor=#E9E9E9
| – ||  || MBA-M || 17.9 || 1.1 km || single || 2 days || 15 Jan 2002 || 15 || align=left | Disc.: LINEAR || 
|- id="2002 AX31" bgcolor=#FA8072
| 3 ||  || MCA || 19.6 || data-sort-value="0.80" | 350 m || multiple || 2002-2014 || 20 Dec 2014 || 28 || align=left | Disc.: NEAT || 
|- id="2002 AD33" bgcolor=#fefefe
| 1 ||  || MBA-I || 18.5 || data-sort-value="0.59" | 590 m || multiple || 2002–2019 || 26 Sep 2019 || 43 || align=left | Disc.: SpacewatchAlt.: 2006 EK27 || 
|- id="2002 AP33" bgcolor=#fefefe
| 2 ||  || MBA-I || 18.2 || data-sort-value="0.68" | 680 m || multiple || 2002–2019 || 04 Feb 2019 || 40 || align=left | Disc.: Spacewatch || 
|- id="2002 AS33" bgcolor=#d6d6d6
| 0 ||  || MBA-O || 17.48 || 1.8 km || multiple || 2002–2021 || 30 Nov 2021 || 66 || align=left | Disc.: Spacewatch || 
|- id="2002 AY33" bgcolor=#E9E9E9
| 3 ||  || MBA-M || 18.3 || data-sort-value="0.92" | 920 m || multiple || 2001–2015 || 16 Jan 2015 || 34 || align=left | Disc.: SpacewatchAlt.: 2015 AA88 || 
|- id="2002 AA34" bgcolor=#d6d6d6
| 0 ||  || MBA-O || 16.40 || 2.9 km || multiple || 2001–2021 || 10 Aug 2021 || 116 || align=left | Disc.: Spacewatch || 
|- id="2002 AJ34" bgcolor=#d6d6d6
| 0 ||  || MBA-O || 16.3 || 3.1 km || multiple || 2000–2020 || 12 May 2020 || 89 || align=left | Disc.: LPL/Spacewatch II || 
|- id="2002 AO43" bgcolor=#fefefe
| 0 ||  || MBA-I || 17.44 || data-sort-value="0.97" | 970 m || multiple || 2002–2021 || 16 May 2021 || 147 || align=left | Disc.: LINEAR || 
|- id="2002 AK45" bgcolor=#fefefe
| 0 ||  || MBA-I || 18.73 || data-sort-value="0.53" | 530 m || multiple || 2002–2021 || 29 Dec 2021 || 110 || align=left | Disc.: LINEAR || 
|- id="2002 AV45" bgcolor=#E9E9E9
| 0 ||  || MBA-M || 17.92 || 1.1 km || multiple || 2002–2021 || 13 Jul 2021 || 92 || align=left | Disc.: LINEAR || 
|- id="2002 AZ48" bgcolor=#E9E9E9
| 0 ||  || MBA-M || 16.9 || 1.8 km || multiple || 2000–2020 || 27 Feb 2020 || 105 || align=left | Disc.: LINEAR || 
|- id="2002 AH54" bgcolor=#E9E9E9
| 0 ||  || MBA-M || 17.49 || 1.8 km || multiple || 2002–2021 || 18 May 2021 || 99 || align=left | Disc.: LINEAR || 
|- id="2002 AZ66" bgcolor=#fefefe
| 0 ||  || MBA-I || 18.5 || data-sort-value="0.59" | 590 m || multiple || 2002–2020 || 13 May 2020 || 95 || align=left | Disc.: Piszkéstető Stn.Alt.: 2016 AB58 || 
|- id="2002 AC68" bgcolor=#fefefe
| 0 ||  || MBA-I || 17.80 || data-sort-value="0.82" | 820 m || multiple || 2002–2021 || 11 Jun 2021 || 118 || align=left | Disc.: SpacewatchAlt.: 2015 XD69 || 
|- id="2002 AE68" bgcolor=#fefefe
| 3 ||  || MBA-I || 18.8 || data-sort-value="0.52" | 520 m || multiple || 2001–2021 || 11 Feb 2021 || 20 || align=left | Disc.: LPL/Spacewatch IIAdded on 5 November 2021 || 
|- id="2002 AQ68" bgcolor=#fefefe
| 0 ||  || MBA-I || 18.4 || data-sort-value="0.62" | 620 m || multiple || 2002–2021 || 05 May 2021 || 49 || align=left | Disc.: Spacewatch || 
|- id="2002 AJ69" bgcolor=#FFC2E0
| 3 ||  || APO || 21.29 || data-sort-value="0.20" | 200 m || multiple || 2002-2023 || 23 Jan 2023 || 25 || align=left | Disc.: LINEAR || 
|- id="2002 AN69" bgcolor=#E9E9E9
| 1 ||  || MBA-M || 17.2 || 1.5 km || multiple || 2002–2020 || 09 Jun 2020 || 48 || align=left | Disc.: NEAT || 
|- id="2002 AY73" bgcolor=#d6d6d6
| 1 ||  || MBA-O || 16.5 || 2.8 km || multiple || 2001–2020 || 22 May 2020 || 63 || align=left | Disc.: LINEARAlt.: 2014 FZ41 || 
|- id="2002 AY75" bgcolor=#fefefe
| 0 ||  || MBA-I || 18.05 || data-sort-value="0.73" | 730 m || multiple || 2001–2021 || 11 Jun 2021 || 102 || align=left | Disc.: LINEARAlt.: 2011 SG81 || 
|- id="2002 AR91" bgcolor=#C2E0FF
| 9 ||  || TNO || 15.95 || 4.0 km || single || 4 days || 14 Jan 2002 || 10 || align=left | Disc.: Cerro TololoAdded on 21 August 2021LoUTNOs, damocloid || 
|- id="2002 AS91" bgcolor=#d6d6d6
| 0 ||  || MBA-O || 17.36 || 1.9 km || multiple || 2002–2020 || 15 Oct 2020 || 56 || align=left | Disc.: Cerro Tololo || 
|- id="2002 AH92" bgcolor=#C2FFFF
| E ||  || JT || 15.2 || 5.1 km || single || 2 days || 14 Jan 2002 || 14 || align=left | Disc.: Cerro TololoGreek camp (L4) || 
|- id="2002 AJ92" bgcolor=#d6d6d6
| 0 ||  || MBA-O || 17.36 || 1.9 km || multiple || 2002–2020 || 13 Sep 2020 || 91 || align=left | Disc.: Cerro Tololo || 
|- id="2002 AK92" bgcolor=#C2FFFF
| – ||  || JT || 15.2 || 5.1 km || single || 2 days || 14 Jan 2002 || 14 || align=left | Disc.: Cerro TololoGreek camp (L4) || 
|- id="2002 AO92" bgcolor=#d6d6d6
| 1 ||  || MBA-O || 17.55 || 1.7 km || multiple || 2002–2021 || 08 Dec 2021 || 55 || align=left | Disc.: Cerro TololoAdded on 24 December 2021 || 
|- id="2002 AQ92" bgcolor=#E9E9E9
| 0 ||  || MBA-M || 17.55 || 1.7 km || multiple || 2000–2021 || 08 Jul 2021 || 65 || align=left | Disc.: Cerro TololoAdded on 21 August 2021Alt.: 2021 LJ19 || 
|- id="2002 AV92" bgcolor=#fefefe
| 1 ||  || MBA-I || 18.50 || data-sort-value="0.59" | 590 m || multiple || 2002–2021 || 27 Sep 2021 || 48 || align=left | Disc.: Cerro TololoAdded on 21 August 2021 || 
|- id="2002 AX92" bgcolor=#E9E9E9
| 0 ||  || MBA-M || 18.00 || 1.1 km || multiple || 2002–2021 || 08 Sep 2021 || 36 || align=left | Disc.: Cerro Tololo || 
|- id="2002 AZ92" bgcolor=#d6d6d6
| – ||  || MBA-O || 17.6 || 1.7 km || single || 4 days || 15 Jan 2002 || 15 || align=left | Disc.: Cerro Tololo || 
|- id="2002 AB93" bgcolor=#E9E9E9
| – ||  || MBA-M || 18.3 || data-sort-value="0.65" | 650 m || single || 4 days || 15 Jan 2002 || 13 || align=left | Disc.: Cerro Tololo || 
|- id="2002 AH93" bgcolor=#fefefe
| 0 ||  || MBA-I || 17.68 || 1.0 km || multiple || 2002-2022 || 29 Aug 2022 || 156 || align=left | Disc.: LINEARAlt.: 2008 VB94 || 
|- id="2002 AM94" bgcolor=#d6d6d6
| 0 ||  = (304660) || MBA-O || 16.29 || 3 km || multiple || 2002-2022 || 14 Dec 2022 || 270 || align=left | Disc.: LINEARAlt.: 2006 WS49 || 
|- id="2002 AY99" bgcolor=#fefefe
| 0 ||  || MBA-I || 18.62 || data-sort-value="0.56" | 560 m || multiple || 2002–2021 || 14 Apr 2021 || 107 || align=left | Disc.: LINEAR || 
|- id="2002 AD110" bgcolor=#E9E9E9
| 1 ||  || MBA-M || 17.39 || 2.2 km || multiple || 2002–2021 || 05 Nov 2021 || 64 || align=left | Disc.: LINEARAlt.: 2010 DQ70 || 
|- id="2002 AN114" bgcolor=#fefefe
| 0 ||  || MBA-I || 18.1 || data-sort-value="0.71" | 710 m || multiple || 2002–2020 || 22 Mar 2020 || 63 || align=left | Disc.: LINEAR || 
|- id="2002 AJ127" bgcolor=#d6d6d6
| 0 ||  || MBA-O || 17.03 || 2.2 km || multiple || 2002–2021 || 23 Nov 2021 || 109 || align=left | Disc.: LINEAR || 
|- id="2002 AG129" bgcolor=#E9E9E9
| 2 ||  || MBA-M || 17.99 || 1.0 km || multiple || 2002-2023 || 22 Jan 2023 || 32 || align=left | Disc.: LINEAR || 
|- id="2002 AM129" bgcolor=#fefefe
| 0 ||  || MBA-I || 17.23 || 1.1 km || multiple || 2000–2021 || 12 May 2021 || 197 || align=left | Disc.: George Obs. || 
|- id="2002 AN129" bgcolor=#FFC2E0
| 9 ||  || APO || 26.2 || data-sort-value="0.020" | 20 m || single || 2 days || 15 Jan 2002 || 10 || align=left | Disc.: LINEAR || 
|- id="2002 AR129" bgcolor=#FFC2E0
| 1 ||  || AMO || 17.7 || 1.0 km || multiple || 2002–2021 || 09 Jan 2021 || 78 || align=left | Disc.: Kingsnake Obs.NEO larger than 1 kilometer || 
|- id="2002 AZ133" bgcolor=#E9E9E9
| 0 ||  || MBA-M || 16.48 || 2.8 km || multiple || 2002–2021 || 07 Apr 2021 || 192 || align=left | Disc.: LINEARAlt.: 2010 WM56 || 
|- id="2002 AY135" bgcolor=#E9E9E9
| 0 ||  || MBA-M || 16.91 || 2.3 km || multiple || 2001–2021 || 04 May 2021 || 143 || align=left | Disc.: LINEAR || 
|- id="2002 AA140" bgcolor=#fefefe
| 0 ||  || MBA-I || 16.9 || 1.2 km || multiple || 2002–2020 || 25 Jan 2020 || 172 || align=left | Disc.: LINEARAdded on 17 January 2021Alt.: 2015 NW5 || 
|- id="2002 AV143" bgcolor=#d6d6d6
| 0 ||  || MBA-O || 16.5 || 2.8 km || multiple || 2002–2021 || 04 Jul 2021 || 56 || align=left | Disc.: LINEARAlt.: 2016 QN132 || 
|- id="2002 AP145" bgcolor=#d6d6d6
| 0 ||  || MBA-O || 16.87 || 2.4 km || multiple || 2002–2021 || 05 Dec 2021 || 117 || align=left | Disc.: LINEAR || 
|- id="2002 AR145" bgcolor=#d6d6d6
| 4 ||  || MBA-O || 17.3 || 1.9 km || multiple || 2001–2018 || 23 Jan 2018 || 34 || align=left | Disc.: LINEAR || 
|- id="2002 AR146" bgcolor=#d6d6d6
| 0 ||  || MBA-O || 16.7 || 2.5 km || multiple || 2002–2020 || 26 May 2020 || 70 || align=left | Disc.: LINEAR || 
|- id="2002 AS146" bgcolor=#d6d6d6
| 0 ||  || MBA-O || 16.12 || 3.3 km || multiple || 2002–2021 || 08 Nov 2021 || 206 || align=left | Disc.: LINEARAlt.: 2006 WS112, 2010 JT138 || 
|- id="2002 AL147" bgcolor=#d6d6d6
| 0 ||  || MBA-O || 16.5 || 2.8 km || multiple || 2002–2020 || 30 Apr 2020 || 112 || align=left | Disc.: LINEARAlt.: 2011 SB267 || 
|- id="2002 AK169" bgcolor=#fefefe
| 0 ||  || MBA-I || 17.6 || data-sort-value="0.90" | 900 m || multiple || 2001–2020 || 22 May 2020 || 128 || align=left | Disc.: LINEARAlt.: 2013 EG92 || 
|- id="2002 AC173" bgcolor=#fefefe
| 0 ||  || MBA-I || 17.9 || data-sort-value="0.78" | 780 m || multiple || 2002–2020 || 22 Mar 2020 || 165 || align=left | Disc.: LINEAR || 
|- id="2002 AF174" bgcolor=#E9E9E9
| 0 ||  || MBA-M || 17.71 || data-sort-value="0.85" | 850 m || multiple || 2002–2021 || 08 Dec 2021 || 82 || align=left | Disc.: LINEAR || 
|- id="2002 AP174" bgcolor=#d6d6d6
| 0 ||  || MBA-O || 16.7 || 2.5 km || multiple || 2002–2020 || 26 Jun 2020 || 77 || align=left | Disc.: LINEAR || 
|- id="2002 AX175" bgcolor=#d6d6d6
| 0 ||  || MBA-O || 16.55 || 2.7 km || multiple || 2000–2021 || 03 Oct 2021 || 114 || align=left | Disc.: LINEAR || 
|- id="2002 AE176" bgcolor=#E9E9E9
| 0 ||  || MBA-M || 16.4 || 2.9 km || multiple || 2002–2020 || 22 Mar 2020 || 232 || align=left | Disc.: LINEAR || 
|- id="2002 AZ183" bgcolor=#d6d6d6
| 0 ||  || MBA-O || 16.65 || 2.6 km || multiple || 2002–2021 || 03 Dec 2021 || 95 || align=left | Disc.: SpacewatchAlt.: 2010 MW39, 2014 MD2 || 
|- id="2002 AD190" bgcolor=#fefefe
| 0 ||  || MBA-I || 17.8 || data-sort-value="0.82" | 820 m || multiple || 2001–2021 || 19 Jan 2021 || 108 || align=left | Disc.: LPL/Spacewatch II || 
|- id="2002 AM191" bgcolor=#fefefe
| 0 ||  || MBA-I || 18.6 || data-sort-value="0.57" | 570 m || multiple || 2002–2020 || 16 Mar 2020 || 36 || align=left | Disc.: CINEOS || 
|- id="2002 AN191" bgcolor=#fefefe
| 0 ||  || MBA-I || 19.30 || data-sort-value="0.41" | 410 m || multiple || 2002–2021 || 02 Oct 2021 || 49 || align=left | Disc.: CINEOS || 
|- id="2002 AY192" bgcolor=#fefefe
| 0 ||  || MBA-I || 18.1 || data-sort-value="0.71" | 710 m || multiple || 1993–2021 || 12 Jan 2021 || 99 || align=left | Disc.: SpacewatchAdded on 17 January 2021Alt.: 2006 BA135 || 
|- id="2002 AN193" bgcolor=#fefefe
| 0 ||  || MBA-I || 18.2 || data-sort-value="0.68" | 680 m || multiple || 2002–2021 || 18 Jan 2021 || 53 || align=left | Disc.: SpacewatchAlt.: 2006 DJ22 || 
|- id="2002 AT194" bgcolor=#d6d6d6
| 1 ||  || MBA-O || 17.1 || 2.1 km || multiple || 2002–2021 || 17 Jan 2021 || 57 || align=left | Disc.: LPL/Spacewatch IIAlt.: 2010 OB80 || 
|- id="2002 AB195" bgcolor=#E9E9E9
| 0 ||  || MBA-M || 18.17 || data-sort-value="0.69" | 690 m || multiple || 2002–2021 || 04 Oct 2021 || 54 || align=left | Disc.: SpacewatchAdded on 11 May 2021Alt.: 2013 TG55 || 
|- id="2002 AC196" bgcolor=#fefefe
| 0 ||  || MBA-I || 18.7 || data-sort-value="0.54" | 540 m || multiple || 2002–2019 || 17 Dec 2019 || 47 || align=left | Disc.: SpacewatchAlt.: 2013 CX30 || 
|- id="2002 AX196" bgcolor=#fefefe
| 1 ||  || HUN || 18.2 || data-sort-value="0.68" | 680 m || multiple || 2002–2021 || 07 Jan 2021 || 42 || align=left | Disc.: LPL/Spacewatch IIAlt.: 2014 SR144 || 
|- id="2002 AF201" bgcolor=#E9E9E9
| 1 ||  || MBA-M || 17.6 || 1.3 km || multiple || 2000–2020 || 25 Jan 2020 || 37 || align=left | Disc.: LINEAR || 
|- id="2002 AZ202" bgcolor=#E9E9E9
| 0 ||  || MBA-M || 17.78 || 1.2 km || multiple || 2002–2021 || 02 Oct 2021 || 74 || align=left | Disc.: LINEAR || 
|- id="2002 AU204" bgcolor=#E9E9E9
| 1 ||  || MBA-M || 18.32 || data-sort-value="0.64" | 640 m || multiple || 2002–2021 || 31 Aug 2021 || 43 || align=left | Disc.: Piszkéstető Stn. || 
|- id="2002 AW204" bgcolor=#E9E9E9
| 0 ||  || MBA-M || 16.2 || 3.2 km || multiple || 2002–2020 || 25 Feb 2020 || 157 || align=left | Disc.: Piszkéstető Stn. || 
|- id="2002 AA206" bgcolor=#d6d6d6
| 0 ||  || MBA-O || 16.96 || 2.3 km || multiple || 2002–2019 || 17 Jan 2019 || 30 || align=left | Disc.: SDSSAdded on 24 December 2021 || 
|- id="2002 AW207" bgcolor=#fefefe
| 0 ||  || MBA-I || 18.1 || data-sort-value="0.71" | 710 m || multiple || 2002–2021 || 08 Apr 2021 || 68 || align=left | Disc.: LPL/Spacewatch IIAdded on 11 May 2021Alt.: 2017 CS15 || 
|- id="2002 AE209" bgcolor=#d6d6d6
| 0 ||  || MBA-O || 17.04 || 2.2 km || multiple || 2002–2021 || 12 Sep 2021 || 92 || align=left | Disc.: NEAT || 
|- id="2002 AQ209" bgcolor=#d6d6d6
| 0 ||  || MBA-O || 16.63 || 2.6 km || multiple || 2002–2021 || 29 Sep 2021 || 119 || align=left | Disc.: SpacewatchAlt.: 2014 GU57 || 
|- id="2002 AW209" bgcolor=#E9E9E9
| 0 ||  || MBA-M || 17.6 || 1.3 km || multiple || 2002–2020 || 27 Feb 2020 || 95 || align=left | Disc.: SDSS || 
|- id="2002 AB210" bgcolor=#E9E9E9
| 0 ||  || MBA-M || 17.1 || 2.1 km || multiple || 2002–2020 || 26 Jan 2020 || 76 || align=left | Disc.: SDSS || 
|- id="2002 AD210" bgcolor=#E9E9E9
| 0 ||  || MBA-M || 16.72 || 1.3 km || multiple || 2001–2021 || 28 Nov 2021 || 206 || align=left | Disc.: LONEOSAlt.: 2010 DL65 || 
|- id="2002 AU210" bgcolor=#E9E9E9
| 0 ||  || MBA-M || 17.23 || 1.1 km || multiple || 1998–2022 || 07 Jan 2022 || 172 || align=left | Disc.: LONEOS || 
|- id="2002 AV210" bgcolor=#fefefe
| 0 ||  || MBA-I || 18.09 || data-sort-value="0.72" | 720 m || multiple || 2002–2021 || 03 Apr 2021 || 132 || align=left | Disc.: Spacewatch || 
|- id="2002 AW210" bgcolor=#d6d6d6
| 0 ||  || MBA-O || 16.69 || 2.6 km || multiple || 2002–2021 || 07 Aug 2021 || 132 || align=left | Disc.: SDSS || 
|- id="2002 AY210" bgcolor=#d6d6d6
| 0 ||  || MBA-O || 16.3 || 3.1 km || multiple || 2002–2020 || 05 Feb 2020 || 89 || align=left | Disc.: Spacewatch || 
|- id="2002 AZ210" bgcolor=#d6d6d6
| 0 ||  || MBA-O || 16.38 || 2.9 km || multiple || 2002–2021 || 28 Oct 2021 || 110 || align=left | Disc.: SDSS || 
|- id="2002 AA211" bgcolor=#d6d6d6
| 0 ||  || MBA-O || 16.70 || 2.5 km || multiple || 2002–2022 || 22 Jan 2022 || 143 || align=left | Disc.: NEAT || 
|- id="2002 AG211" bgcolor=#d6d6d6
| 0 ||  || MBA-O || 16.95 || 2.3 km || multiple || 2002–2021 || 28 Nov 2021 || 117 || align=left | Disc.: LPL/Spacewatch II || 
|- id="2002 AJ211" bgcolor=#E9E9E9
| 0 ||  || MBA-M || 17.18 || 1.1 km || multiple || 2002–2021 || 09 Nov 2021 || 167 || align=left | Disc.: Spacewatch || 
|- id="2002 AL211" bgcolor=#d6d6d6
| 0 ||  || MBA-O || 16.2 || 3.2 km || multiple || 2002–2020 || 16 May 2020 || 99 || align=left | Disc.: SDSS || 
|- id="2002 AN211" bgcolor=#fefefe
| 0 ||  || MBA-I || 18.5 || data-sort-value="0.59" | 590 m || multiple || 2002–2020 || 22 Mar 2020 || 79 || align=left | Disc.: LPL/Spacewatch II || 
|- id="2002 AP211" bgcolor=#fefefe
| 0 ||  || MBA-I || 18.0 || data-sort-value="0.75" | 750 m || multiple || 2002–2021 || 12 Jun 2021 || 118 || align=left | Disc.: SDSS || 
|- id="2002 AQ211" bgcolor=#fefefe
| 0 ||  || MBA-I || 18.9 || data-sort-value="0.49" | 490 m || multiple || 2002–2018 || 04 Oct 2018 || 55 || align=left | Disc.: Spacewatch || 
|- id="2002 AR211" bgcolor=#d6d6d6
| 0 ||  || MBA-O || 16.6 || 2.7 km || multiple || 1997–2020 || 21 May 2020 || 72 || align=left | Disc.: SDSS || 
|- id="2002 AS211" bgcolor=#d6d6d6
| 0 ||  || MBA-O || 16.4 || 2.9 km || multiple || 2000–2020 || 28 Apr 2020 || 72 || align=left | Disc.: SDSS || 
|- id="2002 AT211" bgcolor=#E9E9E9
| 0 ||  || MBA-M || 17.6 || 1.3 km || multiple || 2002–2020 || 15 Apr 2020 || 80 || align=left | Disc.: SDSS || 
|- id="2002 AU211" bgcolor=#E9E9E9
| 0 ||  || MBA-M || 17.31 || 1.9 km || multiple || 2002–2021 || 13 Apr 2021 || 75 || align=left | Disc.: Spacewatch || 
|- id="2002 AW211" bgcolor=#E9E9E9
| 0 ||  || MBA-M || 18.16 || data-sort-value="0.98" | 980 m || multiple || 1996–2021 || 11 Sep 2021 || 137 || align=left | Disc.: Spacewatch || 
|- id="2002 AX211" bgcolor=#d6d6d6
| 0 ||  || MBA-O || 16.72 || 2.5 km || multiple || 2002–2021 || 24 Oct 2021 || 118 || align=left | Disc.: SDSS || 
|- id="2002 AZ211" bgcolor=#fefefe
| 0 ||  || MBA-I || 17.1 || 1.1 km || multiple || 2002–2021 || 17 Jan 2021 || 90 || align=left | Disc.: SDSS || 
|- id="2002 AA212" bgcolor=#E9E9E9
| 0 ||  || MBA-M || 17.57 || data-sort-value="0.91" | 910 m || multiple || 2002–2021 || 06 Nov 2021 || 87 || align=left | Disc.: SDSS || 
|- id="2002 AC212" bgcolor=#fefefe
| 0 ||  || MBA-I || 17.8 || data-sort-value="0.82" | 820 m || multiple || 2002–2021 || 07 Jun 2021 || 118 || align=left | Disc.: LPL/Spacewatch II || 
|- id="2002 AE212" bgcolor=#d6d6d6
| 0 ||  || MBA-O || 17.0 || 2.2 km || multiple || 2000–2019 || 03 Apr 2019 || 63 || align=left | Disc.: Spacewatch || 
|- id="2002 AG212" bgcolor=#d6d6d6
| 0 ||  || MBA-O || 16.2 || 3.2 km || multiple || 2002–2020 || 28 Apr 2020 || 49 || align=left | Disc.: SDSS || 
|- id="2002 AH212" bgcolor=#fefefe
| 0 ||  || MBA-I || 18.0 || data-sort-value="0.75" | 750 m || multiple || 2002–2021 || 11 Jun 2021 || 110 || align=left | Disc.: LPL/Spacewatch IIAlt.: 2017 FM194 || 
|- id="2002 AJ212" bgcolor=#d6d6d6
| 0 ||  || MBA-O || 16.17 || 3.2 km || multiple || 2002–2021 || 27 Nov 2021 || 132 || align=left | Disc.: LPL/Spacewatch IIAlt.: 2010 NL68 || 
|- id="2002 AK212" bgcolor=#fefefe
| 1 ||  || MBA-I || 18.6 || data-sort-value="0.57" | 570 m || multiple || 2002–2019 || 03 Jul 2019 || 51 || align=left | Disc.: Spacewatch || 
|- id="2002 AL212" bgcolor=#fefefe
| 0 ||  || MBA-I || 19.0 || data-sort-value="0.47" | 470 m || multiple || 2002–2020 || 17 Nov 2020 || 104 || align=left | Disc.: Spacewatch || 
|- id="2002 AM212" bgcolor=#E9E9E9
| 1 ||  || MBA-M || 18.15 || data-sort-value="0.70" | 700 m || multiple || 2002–2021 || 04 Dec 2021 || 86 || align=left | Disc.: SDSS || 
|- id="2002 AO212" bgcolor=#fefefe
| 0 ||  || MBA-I || 18.1 || data-sort-value="0.71" | 710 m || multiple || 2002–2020 || 02 Feb 2020 || 107 || align=left | Disc.: Spacewatch || 
|- id="2002 AP212" bgcolor=#fefefe
| 0 ||  || MBA-I || 18.0 || data-sort-value="0.75" | 750 m || multiple || 2002–2021 || 18 Jan 2021 || 75 || align=left | Disc.: SDSS || 
|- id="2002 AQ212" bgcolor=#d6d6d6
| 0 ||  || MBA-O || 16.60 || 2.7 km || multiple || 2002–2021 || 29 Sep 2021 || 50 || align=left | Disc.: SDSS || 
|- id="2002 AS212" bgcolor=#d6d6d6
| 0 ||  || MBA-O || 16.5 || 2.8 km || multiple || 2002–2018 || 15 Dec 2018 || 40 || align=left | Disc.: SDSS || 
|- id="2002 AT212" bgcolor=#fefefe
| 0 ||  || MBA-I || 18.8 || data-sort-value="0.52" | 520 m || multiple || 2002–2020 || 16 Nov 2020 || 110 || align=left | Disc.: SDSS || 
|- id="2002 AU212" bgcolor=#d6d6d6
| 0 ||  || MBA-O || 17.54 || 1.7 km || multiple || 2002–2022 || 27 Jan 2022 || 136 || align=left | Disc.: Spacewatch || 
|- id="2002 AW212" bgcolor=#d6d6d6
| 0 ||  || MBA-O || 16.47 || 2.8 km || multiple || 2002–2021 || 15 Sep 2021 || 65 || align=left | Disc.: Spacewatch || 
|- id="2002 AX212" bgcolor=#d6d6d6
| 0 ||  || MBA-O || 16.9 || 2.3 km || multiple || 2002–2020 || 21 Apr 2020 || 37 || align=left | Disc.: SDSS || 
|- id="2002 AZ212" bgcolor=#d6d6d6
| 0 ||  || MBA-O || 16.8 || 2.4 km || multiple || 2002–2020 || 23 Apr 2020 || 47 || align=left | Disc.: Spacewatch || 
|- id="2002 AC213" bgcolor=#d6d6d6
| 0 ||  || MBA-O || 16.6 || 2.7 km || multiple || 2002–2020 || 27 Apr 2020 || 43 || align=left | Disc.: SDSS || 
|- id="2002 AD213" bgcolor=#d6d6d6
| 0 ||  || MBA-O || 16.70 || 2.5 km || multiple || 2002–2021 || 07 Sep 2021 || 55 || align=left | Disc.: SDSS || 
|- id="2002 AE213" bgcolor=#fefefe
| 0 ||  || MBA-I || 18.7 || data-sort-value="0.54" | 540 m || multiple || 2002–2020 || 12 Sep 2020 || 53 || align=left | Disc.: LPL/Spacewatch II || 
|- id="2002 AF213" bgcolor=#d6d6d6
| 0 ||  || MBA-O || 16.91 || 2.3 km || multiple || 2002–2021 || 08 Sep 2021 || 82 || align=left | Disc.: Spacewatch || 
|- id="2002 AG213" bgcolor=#d6d6d6
| 0 ||  || MBA-O || 17.1 || 2.1 km || multiple || 2002–2018 || 20 Jan 2018 || 37 || align=left | Disc.: SDSSAlt.: 2016 QJ95 || 
|- id="2002 AH213" bgcolor=#d6d6d6
| 0 ||  || MBA-O || 16.93 || 2.3 km || multiple || 2002–2021 || 08 Aug 2021 || 50 || align=left | Disc.: SDSS || 
|- id="2002 AK213" bgcolor=#fefefe
| 0 ||  || MBA-I || 18.3 || data-sort-value="0.65" | 650 m || multiple || 2002–2021 || 07 Jun 2021 || 75 || align=left | Disc.: Spacewatch || 
|- id="2002 AL213" bgcolor=#E9E9E9
| 0 ||  || MBA-M || 17.89 || data-sort-value="0.79" | 790 m || multiple || 2002–2021 || 08 Nov 2021 || 63 || align=left | Disc.: SDSS || 
|- id="2002 AM213" bgcolor=#d6d6d6
| 0 ||  || MBA-O || 17.2 || 2.0 km || multiple || 2002–2019 || 08 Feb 2019 || 35 || align=left | Disc.: SDSS || 
|- id="2002 AN213" bgcolor=#d6d6d6
| 0 ||  || MBA-O || 17.4 || 1.8 km || multiple || 2002–2020 || 11 Dec 2020 || 36 || align=left | Disc.: SDSS || 
|- id="2002 AO213" bgcolor=#d6d6d6
| 0 ||  || MBA-O || 17.1 || 2.1 km || multiple || 2002–2019 || 09 Apr 2019 || 31 || align=left | Disc.: SDSS || 
|- id="2002 AP213" bgcolor=#fefefe
| 0 ||  || HUN || 17.99 || data-sort-value="0.75" | 750 m || multiple || 2002–2022 || 25 Jan 2022 || 72 || align=left | Disc.: SDSS || 
|- id="2002 AQ213" bgcolor=#d6d6d6
| 0 ||  || MBA-O || 17.1 || 2.1 km || multiple || 2002–2019 || 11 Feb 2019 || 37 || align=left | Disc.: SDSS || 
|- id="2002 AR213" bgcolor=#E9E9E9
| 0 ||  || MBA-M || 17.05 || 2.2 km || multiple || 2002–2021 || 14 Apr 2021 || 115 || align=left | Disc.: LPL/Spacewatch IIAlt.: 2016 CP26 || 
|- id="2002 AS213" bgcolor=#E9E9E9
| 0 ||  || MBA-M || 17.88 || data-sort-value="0.79" | 790 m || multiple || 2002–2022 || 04 Jan 2022 || 54 || align=left | Disc.: Spacewatch || 
|- id="2002 AT213" bgcolor=#fefefe
| 0 ||  || MBA-I || 18.2 || data-sort-value="0.68" | 680 m || multiple || 2002–2020 || 23 Jan 2020 || 46 || align=left | Disc.: Spacewatch || 
|- id="2002 AU213" bgcolor=#E9E9E9
| 0 ||  || MBA-M || 17.82 || data-sort-value="0.81" | 810 m || multiple || 2002–2022 || 05 Jan 2022 || 67 || align=left | Disc.: SDSS || 
|- id="2002 AV213" bgcolor=#d6d6d6
| 0 ||  || MBA-O || 17.17 || 2.0 km || multiple || 2002–2021 || 12 Aug 2021 || 32 || align=left | Disc.: Spacewatch || 
|- id="2002 AW213" bgcolor=#d6d6d6
| 3 ||  || MBA-O || 17.3 || 1.9 km || multiple || 2002–2013 || 10 Feb 2013 || 22 || align=left | Disc.: SDSS || 
|- id="2002 AX213" bgcolor=#d6d6d6
| 0 ||  || MBA-O || 16.8 || 2.4 km || multiple || 2002–2020 || 26 May 2020 || 29 || align=left | Disc.: NEAT || 
|- id="2002 AY213" bgcolor=#fefefe
| 0 ||  || MBA-I || 18.42 || data-sort-value="0.62" | 620 m || multiple || 2002–2022 || 27 Jan 2022 || 117 || align=left | Disc.: Spacewatch || 
|- id="2002 AA214" bgcolor=#E9E9E9
| 0 ||  || MBA-M || 17.0 || 1.7 km || multiple || 2002–2021 || 11 Jun 2021 || 108 || align=left | Disc.: Spacewatch || 
|- id="2002 AB214" bgcolor=#d6d6d6
| 0 ||  || MBA-O || 16.4 || 2.9 km || multiple || 2002–2020 || 26 May 2020 || 95 || align=left | Disc.: Spacewatch || 
|- id="2002 AC214" bgcolor=#d6d6d6
| 0 ||  || MBA-O || 16.51 || 2.8 km || multiple || 2002–2020 || 20 Apr 2020 || 71 || align=left | Disc.: Spacewatch || 
|- id="2002 AD214" bgcolor=#fefefe
| 1 ||  || MBA-I || 17.9 || data-sort-value="0.78" | 780 m || multiple || 2002–2018 || 12 Nov 2018 || 64 || align=left | Disc.: Spacewatch || 
|- id="2002 AF214" bgcolor=#E9E9E9
| 0 ||  || MBA-M || 17.2 || 2.0 km || multiple || 2002–2019 || 04 Nov 2019 || 68 || align=left | Disc.: SDSS || 
|- id="2002 AG214" bgcolor=#E9E9E9
| 0 ||  || MBA-M || 18.12 || data-sort-value="0.71" | 710 m || multiple || 2002–2021 || 06 Nov 2021 || 92 || align=left | Disc.: SDSS || 
|- id="2002 AH214" bgcolor=#E9E9E9
| 0 ||  || MBA-M || 16.6 || 2.7 km || multiple || 2002–2020 || 02 Feb 2020 || 89 || align=left | Disc.: Spacewatch || 
|- id="2002 AK214" bgcolor=#d6d6d6
| 0 ||  || MBA-O || 15.92 || 3.6 km || multiple || 1996–2021 || 08 Sep 2021 || 99 || align=left | Disc.: LPL/Spacewatch IIAlt.: 2010 KG99 || 
|- id="2002 AL214" bgcolor=#E9E9E9
| 0 ||  || MBA-M || 17.74 || data-sort-value="0.84" | 840 m || multiple || 2002–2021 || 30 Nov 2021 || 111 || align=left | Disc.: Spacewatch || 
|- id="2002 AM214" bgcolor=#E9E9E9
| 0 ||  || MBA-M || 17.5 || 1.3 km || multiple || 2002–2020 || 22 Mar 2020 || 76 || align=left | Disc.: Spacewatch || 
|- id="2002 AO214" bgcolor=#d6d6d6
| 0 ||  || MBA-O || 16.4 || 2.9 km || multiple || 2002–2020 || 25 Mar 2020 || 52 || align=left | Disc.: SDSS || 
|- id="2002 AP214" bgcolor=#d6d6d6
| 0 ||  || MBA-O || 16.85 || 2.4 km || multiple || 2002–2021 || 30 Jun 2021 || 74 || align=left | Disc.: Spacewatch || 
|- id="2002 AQ214" bgcolor=#d6d6d6
| 0 ||  || MBA-O || 16.75 || 2.5 km || multiple || 2002–2021 || 08 Dec 2021 || 112 || align=left | Disc.: NEAT || 
|- id="2002 AR214" bgcolor=#d6d6d6
| 0 ||  || MBA-O || 16.8 || 2.4 km || multiple || 2002–2020 || 11 May 2020 || 60 || align=left | Disc.: SDSS || 
|- id="2002 AS214" bgcolor=#E9E9E9
| 0 ||  || MBA-M || 17.48 || 1.8 km || multiple || 2002–2021 || 30 Jun 2021 || 96 || align=left | Disc.: Spacewatch || 
|- id="2002 AT214" bgcolor=#E9E9E9
| 0 ||  || MBA-M || 17.67 || 1.2 km || multiple || 2002–2021 || 04 Aug 2021 || 74 || align=left | Disc.: SDSS || 
|- id="2002 AU214" bgcolor=#E9E9E9
| 0 ||  || MBA-M || 17.51 || 1.3 km || multiple || 2002–2021 || 30 May 2021 || 66 || align=left | Disc.: SDSS || 
|- id="2002 AV214" bgcolor=#fefefe
| 0 ||  || MBA-I || 18.8 || data-sort-value="0.52" | 520 m || multiple || 2002–2019 || 29 Oct 2019 || 51 || align=left | Disc.: SDSS || 
|- id="2002 AW214" bgcolor=#E9E9E9
| 0 ||  || MBA-M || 17.57 || 1.7 km || multiple || 2002–2021 || 03 Apr 2021 || 80 || align=left | Disc.: ADAS || 
|- id="2002 AX214" bgcolor=#E9E9E9
| 1 ||  || MBA-M || 18.1 || 1.3 km || multiple || 2002–2019 || 25 Nov 2019 || 44 || align=left | Disc.: LPL/Spacewatch II || 
|- id="2002 AY214" bgcolor=#d6d6d6
| 0 ||  || MBA-O || 17.0 || 2.2 km || multiple || 2002–2020 || 27 Apr 2020 || 41 || align=left | Disc.: SDSS || 
|- id="2002 AZ214" bgcolor=#d6d6d6
| 0 ||  || MBA-O || 16.4 || 2.9 km || multiple || 2001–2020 || 20 May 2020 || 65 || align=left | Disc.: SDSS || 
|- id="2002 AA215" bgcolor=#d6d6d6
| 0 ||  || MBA-O || 17.5 || 1.8 km || multiple || 2002–2020 || 19 Apr 2020 || 57 || align=left | Disc.: Spacewatch || 
|- id="2002 AB215" bgcolor=#d6d6d6
| 0 ||  || MBA-O || 17.07 || 2.1 km || multiple || 1995–2021 || 26 Nov 2021 || 58 || align=left | Disc.: SDSS || 
|- id="2002 AC215" bgcolor=#E9E9E9
| 0 ||  || MBA-M || 18.1 || 1.0 km || multiple || 2002–2020 || 17 Jul 2020 || 54 || align=left | Disc.: LPL/Spacewatch II || 
|- id="2002 AD215" bgcolor=#d6d6d6
| 0 ||  || MBA-O || 16.9 || 2.3 km || multiple || 2002–2019 || 09 Feb 2019 || 31 || align=left | Disc.: SDSS || 
|- id="2002 AE215" bgcolor=#d6d6d6
| 2 ||  || MBA-O || 17.1 || 2.1 km || multiple || 2002–2019 || 10 Jan 2019 || 34 || align=left | Disc.: Spacewatch || 
|- id="2002 AF215" bgcolor=#fefefe
| 0 ||  || HUN || 19.2 || data-sort-value="0.43" | 430 m || multiple || 2002–2019 || 05 Nov 2019 || 37 || align=left | Disc.: SDSS || 
|- id="2002 AH215" bgcolor=#fefefe
| 0 ||  || MBA-I || 17.9 || data-sort-value="0.78" | 780 m || multiple || 2002–2020 || 19 Nov 2020 || 48 || align=left | Disc.: SDSS || 
|- id="2002 AJ215" bgcolor=#fefefe
| 0 ||  || HUN || 19.14 || data-sort-value="0.44" | 440 m || multiple || 2002–2021 || 14 Jun 2021 || 60 || align=left | Disc.: SDSS || 
|- id="2002 AK215" bgcolor=#d6d6d6
| 0 ||  || MBA-O || 15.9 || 3.7 km || multiple || 2002–2021 || 07 Jun 2021 || 89 || align=left | Disc.: SDSS || 
|- id="2002 AL215" bgcolor=#E9E9E9
| 0 ||  || MBA-M || 17.7 || 1.6 km || multiple || 2002–2021 || 17 Jan 2021 || 32 || align=left | Disc.: SDSS || 
|- id="2002 AM215" bgcolor=#C2FFFF
| 0 ||  || JT || 14.56 || 6.8 km || multiple || 2002–2021 || 04 Dec 2021 || 78 || align=left | Disc.: Cerro TololoGreek camp (L4) || 
|- id="2002 AN215" bgcolor=#d6d6d6
| 0 ||  || MBA-O || 16.8 || 2.4 km || multiple || 2002–2020 || 16 Mar 2020 || 31 || align=left | Disc.: Cerro Tololo || 
|- id="2002 AP215" bgcolor=#d6d6d6
| 0 ||  || MBA-O || 16.6 || 2.7 km || multiple || 2002–2020 || 24 Jan 2020 || 32 || align=left | Disc.: Cerro Tololo || 
|- id="2002 AQ215" bgcolor=#d6d6d6
| 0 ||  || MBA-O || 16.77 || 2.5 km || multiple || 2002–2021 || 28 Nov 2021 || 58 || align=left | Disc.: Cerro Tololo || 
|- id="2002 AR215" bgcolor=#d6d6d6
| 0 ||  || MBA-O || 16.5 || 2.8 km || multiple || 2002–2020 || 13 May 2020 || 112 || align=left | Disc.: Spacewatch || 
|- id="2002 AS215" bgcolor=#d6d6d6
| 0 ||  || MBA-O || 16.99 || 2.2 km || multiple || 2002–2021 || 30 Nov 2021 || 132 || align=left | Disc.: SDSSAlt.: 2010 MW75 || 
|- id="2002 AW215" bgcolor=#d6d6d6
| 0 ||  || MBA-O || 17.3 || 1.9 km || multiple || 2002–2020 || 15 Dec 2020 || 60 || align=left | Disc.: SDSS || 
|- id="2002 AX215" bgcolor=#d6d6d6
| 0 ||  || MBA-O || 16.9 || 2.3 km || multiple || 2002–2020 || 23 Apr 2020 || 54 || align=left | Disc.: Spacewatch || 
|- id="2002 AZ215" bgcolor=#E9E9E9
| 0 ||  || MBA-M || 18.27 || data-sort-value="0.66" | 660 m || multiple || 2002–2021 || 02 Dec 2021 || 88 || align=left | Disc.: Spacewatch || 
|- id="2002 AA216" bgcolor=#d6d6d6
| 0 ||  || MBA-O || 17.1 || 2.1 km || multiple || 2002–2020 || 22 Apr 2020 || 53 || align=left | Disc.: SDSS || 
|- id="2002 AB216" bgcolor=#d6d6d6
| 0 ||  || MBA-O || 17.10 || 2.1 km || multiple || 2002–2021 || 13 Jul 2021 || 47 || align=left | Disc.: Spacewatch || 
|- id="2002 AD216" bgcolor=#d6d6d6
| 0 ||  || MBA-O || 17.2 || 2.0 km || multiple || 2002–2019 || 04 Apr 2019 || 37 || align=left | Disc.: SDSS || 
|- id="2002 AF216" bgcolor=#fefefe
| 1 ||  || HUN || 18.4 || data-sort-value="0.62" | 620 m || multiple || 2002–2020 || 23 Dec 2020 || 43 || align=left | Disc.: Spacewatch || 
|- id="2002 AG216" bgcolor=#fefefe
| 0 ||  || MBA-I || 18.6 || data-sort-value="0.57" | 570 m || multiple || 2002–2020 || 23 Mar 2020 || 33 || align=left | Disc.: LPL/Spacewatch II || 
|- id="2002 AH216" bgcolor=#d6d6d6
| 0 ||  || MBA-O || 17.38 || 1.9 km || multiple || 2002–2021 || 05 Sep 2021 || 77 || align=left | Disc.: SDSS || 
|- id="2002 AJ216" bgcolor=#d6d6d6
| 0 ||  || MBA-O || 16.92 || 2.3 km || multiple || 2002–2021 || 05 Oct 2021 || 55 || align=left | Disc.: SDSS || 
|- id="2002 AK216" bgcolor=#E9E9E9
| 0 ||  || MBA-M || 18.25 || data-sort-value="0.67" | 670 m || multiple || 2002–2021 || 26 Oct 2021 || 35 || align=left | Disc.: SDSS || 
|- id="2002 AL216" bgcolor=#fefefe
| 0 ||  || MBA-I || 18.4 || data-sort-value="0.62" | 620 m || multiple || 2002–2020 || 23 Nov 2020 || 51 || align=left | Disc.: Spacewatch || 
|- id="2002 AM216" bgcolor=#d6d6d6
| 0 ||  || MBA-O || 16.7 || 2.5 km || multiple || 2002–2020 || 21 Apr 2020 || 66 || align=left | Disc.: SDSS || 
|- id="2002 AN216" bgcolor=#d6d6d6
| 0 ||  || MBA-O || 17.25 || 2.0 km || multiple || 1995–2021 || 13 Sep 2021 || 43 || align=left | Disc.: SDSS || 
|- id="2002 AO216" bgcolor=#fefefe
| 0 ||  || MBA-I || 19.1 || data-sort-value="0.45" | 450 m || multiple || 2002–2020 || 21 Feb 2020 || 43 || align=left | Disc.: SDSS || 
|- id="2002 AQ216" bgcolor=#d6d6d6
| 0 ||  || MBA-O || 16.39 || 2.9 km || multiple || 2002–2021 || 28 Jul 2021 || 101 || align=left | Disc.: SDSS || 
|- id="2002 AR216" bgcolor=#E9E9E9
| 0 ||  || MBA-M || 17.41 || 1.8 km || multiple || 1993–2021 || 15 Apr 2021 || 88 || align=left | Disc.: SDSS || 
|- id="2002 AS216" bgcolor=#d6d6d6
| 0 ||  || MBA-O || 16.8 || 2.4 km || multiple || 2002–2020 || 12 May 2020 || 68 || align=left | Disc.: SDSS || 
|- id="2002 AT216" bgcolor=#fefefe
| 0 ||  || MBA-I || 18.18 || data-sort-value="0.69" | 690 m || multiple || 2002–2021 || 14 May 2021 || 89 || align=left | Disc.: SDSS || 
|- id="2002 AU216" bgcolor=#d6d6d6
| 0 ||  || MBA-O || 17.31 || 1.9 km || multiple || 2002–2021 || 08 Aug 2021 || 56 || align=left | Disc.: SDSS || 
|- id="2002 AV216" bgcolor=#fefefe
| 0 ||  || MBA-I || 18.40 || data-sort-value="0.62" | 620 m || multiple || 2002–2021 || 07 Sep 2021 || 64 || align=left | Disc.: SDSS || 
|- id="2002 AW216" bgcolor=#E9E9E9
| 1 ||  || MBA-M || 18.23 || data-sort-value="0.67" | 670 m || multiple || 2002–2021 || 04 Oct 2021 || 64 || align=left | Disc.: Spacewatch || 
|- id="2002 AX216" bgcolor=#d6d6d6
| 1 ||  || MBA-O || 17.44 || 1.8 km || multiple || 2002–2021 || 06 Nov 2021 || 64 || align=left | Disc.: SDSS || 
|- id="2002 AY216" bgcolor=#E9E9E9
| 0 ||  || MBA-M || 17.2 || 2.0 km || multiple || 2002–2020 || 26 Jan 2020 || 37 || align=left | Disc.: SDSS || 
|- id="2002 AA217" bgcolor=#d6d6d6
| 1 ||  || MBA-O || 17.6 || 1.7 km || multiple || 2002–2018 || 20 Apr 2018 || 33 || align=left | Disc.: SDSS || 
|- id="2002 AD217" bgcolor=#d6d6d6
| 0 ||  || MBA-O || 17.50 || 1.8 km || multiple || 2002–2021 || 30 Aug 2021 || 53 || align=left | Disc.: SpacewatchAdded on 19 October 2020 || 
|- id="2002 AF217" bgcolor=#fefefe
| 1 ||  || MBA-I || 18.5 || data-sort-value="0.59" | 590 m || multiple || 2002–2021 || 15 Feb 2021 || 51 || align=left | Disc.: SpacewatchAdded on 17 January 2021 || 
|- id="2002 AH217" bgcolor=#d6d6d6
| 0 ||  || MBA-O || 16.5 || 2.8 km || multiple || 2002–2021 || 30 Sep 2021 || 41 || align=left | Disc.: LPL/Spacewatch IIAdded on 5 November 2021 || 
|}
back to top

B 

|- id="2002 BG" bgcolor=#FFC2E0
| 2 || 2002 BG || AMO || 20.5 || data-sort-value="0.28" | 280 m || multiple || 2002–2008 || 10 Feb 2008 || 40 || align=left | Disc.: LINEAR || 
|- id="2002 BM" bgcolor=#FFC2E0
| 7 || 2002 BM || APO || 24.1 || data-sort-value="0.054" | 54 m || single || 2 days || 21 Jan 2002 || 23 || align=left | Disc.: LINEARAMO at MPC || 
|- id="2002 BA1" bgcolor=#FFC2E0
| 1 ||  || AMO || 21.5 || data-sort-value="0.18" | 180 m || multiple || 2002–2005 || 16 May 2005 || 153 || align=left | Disc.: Spacewatch || 
|- id="2002 BH2" bgcolor=#E9E9E9
| 0 ||  || MBA-M || 17.43 || 1.4 km || multiple || 2002–2021 || 30 Aug 2021 || 64 || align=left | Disc.: LPL/Spacewatch II || 
|- id="2002 BJ2" bgcolor=#FFC2E0
| 2 ||  || APO || 17.0 || 1.4 km || multiple || 1996–2017 || 02 Jun 2017 || 68 || align=left | Disc.: Desert Eagle Obs.NEO larger than 1 kilometer || 
|- id="2002 BM5" bgcolor=#FFC2E0
| 5 ||  || AMO || 22.3 || data-sort-value="0.12" | 120 m || single || 47 days || 11 Mar 2002 || 29 || align=left | Disc.: LINEAR || 
|- id="2002 BG18" bgcolor=#fefefe
| 0 ||  || MBA-I || 17.5 || data-sort-value="0.94" | 940 m || multiple || 2002–2020 || 27 Apr 2020 || 137 || align=left | Disc.: LINEARAlt.: 2011 UQ273, 2015 XX365 || 
|- id="2002 BO20" bgcolor=#fefefe
| 1 ||  || HUN || 18.6 || data-sort-value="0.57" | 570 m || multiple || 2001–2021 || 03 Jun 2021 || 104 || align=left | Disc.: LINEAR || 
|- id="2002 BF25" bgcolor=#FFC2E0
| 0 ||  || APO || 22.62 || data-sort-value="0.152" | 152 m || multiple || 2002–2020 || 18 Jun 2020 || 98 || align=left | Disc.: LINEAR || 
|- id="2002 BG25" bgcolor=#FFC2E0
| 0 ||  || APO || 20.9 || data-sort-value="0.23" | 230 m || multiple || 2002–2017 || 15 Feb 2017 || 114 || align=left | Disc.: LINEAR || 
|- id="2002 BM26" bgcolor=#FFC2E0
| 0 ||  || APO || 20.1 || data-sort-value="0.34" | 340 m || multiple || 2002–2007 || 29 Jan 2007 || 239 || align=left | Disc.: LINEARPotentially hazardous objectAMO at MPC || 
|- id="2002 BG31" bgcolor=#E9E9E9
| 0 ||  || MBA-M || 16.70 || 2.5 km || multiple || 2002–2021 || 14 May 2021 || 118 || align=left | Disc.: LINEARAlt.: 2016 AP116 || 
|- id="2002 BU32" bgcolor=#d6d6d6
| 0 ||  || MBA-O || 16.0 || 3.5 km || multiple || 2002–2020 || 16 Apr 2020 || 96 || align=left | Disc.: LPL/Spacewatch II || 
|- id="2002 BV32" bgcolor=#fefefe
| 0 ||  || MBA-I || 17.20 || 1.1 km || multiple || 2002–2021 || 20 Apr 2021 || 117 || align=left | Disc.: LPL/Spacewatch II || 
|- id="2002 BB33" bgcolor=#d6d6d6
| 0 ||  || MBA-O || 15.8 || 3.9 km || multiple || 2002–2020 || 15 Apr 2020 || 84 || align=left | Disc.: Spacewatch || 
|- id="2002 BE33" bgcolor=#E9E9E9
| 0 ||  || MBA-M || 18.57 || data-sort-value="0.57" | 570 m || multiple || 2002–2021 || 26 Nov 2021 || 92 || align=left | Disc.: LPL/Spacewatch II || 
|- id="2002 BF33" bgcolor=#d6d6d6
| 0 ||  || MBA-O || 16.4 || 2.9 km || multiple || 2002–2021 || 18 Jan 2021 || 98 || align=left | Disc.: LPL/Spacewatch II || 
|- id="2002 BG33" bgcolor=#fefefe
| 1 ||  || MBA-I || 18.1 || data-sort-value="0.71" | 710 m || multiple || 2002–2016 || 23 Nov 2016 || 45 || align=left | Disc.: LPL/Spacewatch II || 
|- id="2002 BH33" bgcolor=#fefefe
| 2 ||  || MBA-I || 18.3 || data-sort-value="0.65" | 650 m || multiple || 2002–2018 || 14 Jun 2018 || 47 || align=left | Disc.: LPL/Spacewatch II || 
|- id="2002 BJ33" bgcolor=#d6d6d6
| 0 ||  || MBA-O || 17.0 || 2.2 km || multiple || 2002–2020 || 26 May 2020 || 56 || align=left | Disc.: LPL/Spacewatch II || 
|- id="2002 BK33" bgcolor=#d6d6d6
| 1 ||  || MBA-O || 16.7 || 2.5 km || multiple || 2002–2018 || 20 Jan 2018 || 40 || align=left | Disc.: LPL/Spacewatch II || 
|- id="2002 BL33" bgcolor=#d6d6d6
| 0 ||  || MBA-O || 16.68 || 2.6 km || multiple || 2002–2021 || 31 Aug 2021 || 48 || align=left | Disc.: LPL/Spacewatch II || 
|- id="2002 BM33" bgcolor=#d6d6d6
| 0 ||  || MBA-O || 17.2 || 2.0 km || multiple || 2002–2020 || 24 Dec 2020 || 80 || align=left | Disc.: LPL/Spacewatch II || 
|- id="2002 BN33" bgcolor=#E9E9E9
| 0 ||  || MBA-M || 17.83 || data-sort-value="0.81" | 810 m || multiple || 2002–2020 || 16 Aug 2020 || 87 || align=left | Disc.: LPL/Spacewatch II || 
|- id="2002 BO33" bgcolor=#E9E9E9
| 0 ||  || MBA-M || 17.09 || 2.1 km || multiple || 2002–2021 || 11 Apr 2021 || 81 || align=left | Disc.: LPL/Spacewatch II || 
|- id="2002 BR33" bgcolor=#d6d6d6
| 0 ||  || MBA-O || 17.3 || 1.9 km || multiple || 2002–2020 || 15 Dec 2020 || 72 || align=left | Disc.: LPL/Spacewatch II || 
|- id="2002 BT33" bgcolor=#d6d6d6
| 0 ||  || MBA-O || 16.9 || 2.3 km || multiple || 2002–2019 || 11 Feb 2019 || 63 || align=left | Disc.: LPL/Spacewatch II || 
|- id="2002 BU33" bgcolor=#fefefe
| 0 ||  || MBA-I || 17.6 || data-sort-value="0.90" | 900 m || multiple || 2002–2021 || 08 Jun 2021 || 81 || align=left | Disc.: LPL/Spacewatch II || 
|- id="2002 BV33" bgcolor=#d6d6d6
| 0 ||  || MBA-O || 16.9 || 2.3 km || multiple || 2002–2020 || 21 Apr 2020 || 58 || align=left | Disc.: LPL/Spacewatch II || 
|- id="2002 BW33" bgcolor=#fefefe
| 0 ||  || MBA-I || 18.2 || data-sort-value="0.68" | 680 m || multiple || 2002–2020 || 21 Mar 2020 || 57 || align=left | Disc.: Spacewatch || 
|- id="2002 BY33" bgcolor=#fefefe
| 0 ||  || MBA-I || 18.0 || data-sort-value="0.75" | 750 m || multiple || 2002–2021 || 18 Jan 2021 || 56 || align=left | Disc.: LPL/Spacewatch II || 
|- id="2002 BZ33" bgcolor=#E9E9E9
| 0 ||  || MBA-M || 17.51 || 1.3 km || multiple || 2002–2021 || 01 Oct 2021 || 80 || align=left | Disc.: LPL/Spacewatch II || 
|- id="2002 BA34" bgcolor=#d6d6d6
| 0 ||  || MBA-O || 15.3 || 4.8 km || multiple || 1996–2020 || 24 Jan 2020 || 35 || align=left | Disc.: ADAS || 
|- id="2002 BB34" bgcolor=#E9E9E9
| 1 ||  || MBA-M || 17.92 || data-sort-value="0.77" | 770 m || multiple || 2002–2022 || 27 Jan 2022 || 40 || align=left | Disc.: LPL/Spacewatch II || 
|- id="2002 BC34" bgcolor=#fefefe
| 0 ||  || MBA-I || 19.0 || data-sort-value="0.47" | 470 m || multiple || 2002–2018 || 13 Aug 2018 || 29 || align=left | Disc.: LPL/Spacewatch II || 
|- id="2002 BD34" bgcolor=#fefefe
| 0 ||  || MBA-I || 17.7 || data-sort-value="0.86" | 860 m || multiple || 1993–2021 || 18 Jan 2021 || 83 || align=left | Disc.: Spacewatch || 
|- id="2002 BE34" bgcolor=#d6d6d6
| 0 ||  || MBA-O || 16.86 || 2.4 km || multiple || 2002–2021 || 27 Nov 2021 || 93 || align=left | Disc.: Spacewatch || 
|- id="2002 BF34" bgcolor=#d6d6d6
| 0 ||  || MBA-O || 16.5 || 2.8 km || multiple || 2002–2021 || 07 Jun 2021 || 51 || align=left | Disc.: Spacewatch || 
|- id="2002 BG34" bgcolor=#E9E9E9
| 2 ||  || MBA-M || 18.59 || data-sort-value="0.57" | 570 m || multiple || 2002–2021 || 26 Nov 2021 || 24 || align=left | Disc.: LPL/Spacewatch II || 
|- id="2002 BH34" bgcolor=#fefefe
| 0 ||  || MBA-I || 18.49 || data-sort-value="0.60" | 600 m || multiple || 2002–2021 || 28 Nov 2021 || 66 || align=left | Disc.: Spacewatch || 
|- id="2002 BK34" bgcolor=#fefefe
| 0 ||  || MBA-I || 18.7 || data-sort-value="0.54" | 540 m || multiple || 2002–2020 || 25 Feb 2020 || 61 || align=left | Disc.: LPL/Spacewatch II || 
|- id="2002 BL34" bgcolor=#fefefe
| 0 ||  || MBA-I || 18.9 || data-sort-value="0.49" | 490 m || multiple || 2002–2020 || 22 Mar 2020 || 48 || align=left | Disc.: LPL/Spacewatch II || 
|- id="2002 BM34" bgcolor=#E9E9E9
| 0 ||  || MBA-M || 17.53 || 1.3 km || multiple || 2000–2021 || 05 Jul 2021 || 52 || align=left | Disc.: LPL/Spacewatch IIAdded on 19 October 2020 || 
|- id="2002 BN34" bgcolor=#d6d6d6
| 0 ||  || MBA-O || 17.71 || 1.6 km || multiple || 2002–2021 || 25 Nov 2021 || 41 || align=left | Disc.: SpacewatchAdded on 21 August 2021 || 
|}
back to top

References 
 

Lists of unnumbered minor planets